These are the Billboard Hot Dance/Disco Club Play and 12 Inch Singles Sales number-one hits of 1989.

See also
1989 in music
List of number-one dance hits (United States)
List of artists who reached number one on the U.S. Dance chart

References

1989
1989 record charts
1989 in American music